Madison is a NJ Transit station in Madison, New Jersey, United States, along the Morristown Line. The station was built in 1916 after the local government passed an ordinance for $159,000 with the cooperation of the Delaware, Lackawanna and Western Railroad in the planning of the depot. Mrs. D. Willis James financed much of the road grading caused by the track elevation. The tracks were elevated through the downtown and no established roadways were hindered by crossing delays. The station included baggage and cargo facilities readily accessible by wagons as well as the stationmaster offices, a newsstand, and waiting facilities featuring extensive banks of high-backed wooden seating. Weeping Mulberry trees were planted among the landscaping and in natural areas in the parking area. In 1984, the station was listed in the New Jersey Register of Historic Places and National Register of Historic Places as part of the Operating Passenger Railroad Stations Thematic Resource.

History

Construction and opening (1835–1838) 
The line that currently runs through Madison began in 1835 with the charter of the Morris and Essex Railroad, being approved by the New Jersey State Legislature on January 29. As part of an agreement during the surveying process to get land to run through the borough of Madison, the Morris and Essex would be required to stop all trains within the municipality. The agreement was signed off in January 1836 by the local Presbyterian Church on a hill near the future site of Kings Road. The service would run from Newark to nearby Morristown. Madison was one of only three regular stops, with Orange and Millburn. The first passenger train to run through Madison came on September 17, 1837, run by horses. The two horse-drawn rail car would serve 30 people for several months, soon replaced by a locomotive known as the "Orange", built by Seth Boyden.

The first station structure at Madison was a local shack that was used for railroad services near a turntable. However, despite a standing station in Madison, passengers were allowed to use a white handkerchief to flag down the train for a stop. The station would also serve as the temporary terminus of the Morris and Essex, as the line was not complete into Morristown on January 1, 1838.

Upgrades and station fire (1841–1879) 
Frank Lathrop became the first regular commuter from Madison to Newark on a regular basis, one of an average of three that boarded at Madison daily. In September 1843, local residents in Madison worked to get a new station constructed  at the site of the modern-day intersection of Waverly Place and Kings Road. However, by 1860, an upgrade was needed once again when Samuel Tuttle, the pastor at the Madison Presbyterian Church and Lathrop had the Lackawanna expand facilities at Madison. Upgrading the station would result in moving the station, Madison's municipal hall, the Methodist Church and a few local residences to the western side of Waverly Place. The railroad and Madison shared the entire cost of $12,000. In 1861, the railroad track through Madison was upgraded from older wooden ties to stronger ones built for better equipment. Construction of a second track through the borough came in 1867. The Delaware, Lackawanna and Western Railroad took control of the Morris and Essex Railroad, which was struggling financially, on December 19, 1868.

However, the station depot in Madison, along with several local facilities went up in flames on October 21, 1877. The fire broke out in the feed room of a local grocery owned by I. J. Ayers on Waverly Place. After someone busted open a door to get to the fire, the winds soon engulfed the grocery and other nearby buildings, including the local YMCA and the house of G.W. Squier, a local resident. Another local resident, along with a cigar store, were also claimed in the fire. After the fire consumed Squier's house, the flames moved to the railroad station in under ten minutes. All the tickets and baggage within the depot were saved from the flames. However, the station was a total loss. The debris from the ruined Madison station were removed on October 22. Plans for a new station were being formulated by October 27.

Frustration began to develop in Madison by January 1878 about the lack of construction of a new depot. In the meantime, baggage and ticket services at Madison were being dealt with across the tracks, resulting in people having to cross the tracks, a dangerous proposition. Frustration manifested through February and into March, A pile of stones came to the site of the burned out depot by early March 1878, however locals believed the railroad was not going to begin construction any time soon. However, by March 16, lime had arrived for the preparation of construction of a new depot, which would begin within the next week. A local citizen of prominence got in contact with Lackawanna, demanding a depot be put up soon or at least a structure for reasonable service. The platform was flagged for construction in November 1878 and completed on January 1, 1879.

The Lackawanna wired the depot for electricity in March 1903.

Proposed track elevation  (1913–1914) 
In August 1913, the Lackawanna Railroad bought up around $250,000 worth of local property between Chatham and Madison. The land, which totaled 1, along with a full house, was purchased through Alexander Eagle's local firm. The Madison Eagle speculated that the buyouts were for the straightening of railroad tracks between Madison and Chatham. The real estate agency noted that the railroad had been quietly purchasing land rather than doing it so publicly. A survey done several years prior noted that one lot, which took up , would result in several rooms of the owner's house being removed.

First ordinance attempt (December 1913)
In December 1913, George J. Ray, the chief engineer of the Lackawanna Railroad attended a meeting of the Madison borough council. The engineer explained to the borough about how each phase of the track elevation would go. A new railroad station would be built on the southern side of the tracks at the intersection of Green and Maple Avenues. A park would surround part of the station. The new station would have reasonable parkway space and approaches from Waverly Place, Green and Maple Avenues and Prospect Street. The project would include beautification of local lawns near the depot. A tunnel would connect each side of the tracks, which including a waiting room on the northern side of the tracks. The southern side would across include a baggage and express carriageway for travelers.

Under this design, the railroad grade crossings at Union, Samson and Madison Avenues, Kings and Green Village Roads, Prospect and Elm Streets, along with Waverly Place would become underpasses for the road to cross under the tracks. Division Street and Ridgedale Avenue would have their crossings abandoned rather than replaced, and Prospect Street would be widened from the station to Main Street. Kings Road would be closed across the tracks, but the local sidewalks would remain open. Woodland Avenue would be extended by the railroad from Division Avenue to Lafayette Avenue in Chatham. The rest of the roads were to cross the tracks with steel girder bridges.

However, Ridgedale Avenue's closing was met by opposition by the mayor-elect of Madison, Benyew D. Philhower. Philhower lived near the crossing and felt that if Ridgedale was closed, there would be no crossing between Madison and Elm. Ray disputed that Ridgedale was studied and that less than 300 vehicles used the crossing, which would have been an 11 percent grade going on an overpass and 10 percent in an underpass. This would cause problems with the Ridgedale and Madison junction nearby and add $100,000 to the $1 million cost of the project.

Talks between the borough of Madison and the Lackawanna Railroad broke down late in December 1913. Despite the railroad offering extra concessions on the Madison station depot (concrete ballast floors on all bridges and concreting the Waverly Place and Green Village Road crossings). The railroad would also provide drainage and sewers at Prospect Street and Green Avenue along with some property on Kings Road. President of the Lackawanna Railroad, William Truesdale offered these changes only if the borough accepted them after complaints. However, this was turned down by the borough. The negotiations came to a close.

Station layout and services
Madison station is a two-track railroad station along New Jersey Transit's Morristown Line, a part of the Morris and Essex Lines. The station is two-levels with two low-level side platforms that include mini-high-level platforms. There are two ticket vending machines in the walkway tunnel under the platforms. The station also has a part-time ticket office, open only from 5:30 am to 9:00 am on Monday through Friday and closed entirely on weekends. Madison has three parking lots, all on Kings Road and Prospect Street, containing 413 parking spaces. Of those, only ten are accessible for handicapped persons as per the Americans with Disabilities Act of 1990. Two lots serve daily parking and all three have permit-only parking, run by the borough of Madison. Bicycle racks and lockers are also available for those who need them. The station is in fare zone 11.

There is a single NJ Transit bus connection at Madison station, the 873, which runs six days a week (excluding Sunday) from Parsippany–Troy Hills to Livingston.

There is also a private bus connection operated by Boxcar Transit at the Madison station, which runs five days a week directly to and from Midtown Manhattan.

See also
List of New Jersey Transit stations
National Register of Historic Places listings in Morris County, New Jersey

Bibliography

References

External links

Friends of the Madison Train Station
 Prospect Street entrance from Google Maps Street View
 Green Avenue entrance from Google Maps Street View
Video of Madison Train Station

NJ Transit Rail Operations stations
Railway stations on the National Register of Historic Places in New Jersey
Railway stations in the United States opened in 1837
Madison, New Jersey
Railway stations in Morris County, New Jersey
Former Delaware, Lackawanna and Western Railroad stations
National Register of Historic Places in Morris County, New Jersey